Peter of Foix the Elder (Fr.: Pierre de Foix, le vieux) (1386 – 13 December 1464) was a French cardinal, created in 1409.

He was the son of Archambaud de Grailly, captal de Buch and Isabella, Countess of Foix.

He was a papal legate in Avignon (1433–1464) and Archbishop of Arles from 1450 to 1463.

He founded the Collège de Foix in Toulouse.

External links

1386 births
1464 deaths
Pierre
15th-century French cardinals
Cardinal-bishops of Albano
Bishops of Aire
Archbishops of Arles
Bishops of Comminges
Bishops of Dax
Bishops of Lescar
Diplomats of the Holy See